Pora Ora is a series of educational games for children from 5 to 12 intended for use both at home and in the classroom. Pora Ora is owned by Caped Koala Studios.

Gameplay
Pora Ora games can be played alone or through Pora Pal HQ, where players can customise their player home, collect virtual pets called Pora Pals, play games, and interact with friends and classmates. Players collect wisdom, creativity, and exploration points by playing games to keep their Poral Pal healthy and happy. Teachers can set Pora Ora to "school mode," which allows them to use the program in the classroom. Parents and teachers can access parental controls, monitor their child's or children's progress, and offer in-game rewards.

See also 
 Educational game

References

External links 
 Official website.

Educational software